Clyde Nelson Friz (1867–1942)  was an architect in Baltimore, Maryland who was active in his field from 1900 until his death in 1942.  He is noted for designing the main Enoch Pratt Free Library Branch, the Scottish Rite Temple with John Russell Pope, the Standard Oil Building as well as numerous residential commissions.

References 

20th-century American architects
Architects from Baltimore
1867 births
1943 deaths